Oleksandr Petrovych Khvoshch (born 1 October 1981 in Stakhanov, Ukrainian SSR) is an amateur Ukrainian Greco-Roman wrestler, who competed in the men's lightweight category. He scored two career medals (one silver and one bronze) in the 60-kg division at the European Championships, and also represented his nation Ukraine at the 2004 Summer Olympics. Throughout his sporting career, Khvoshch has been training full-time as a member of the wrestling team for Dynamo Sports Club in Zaporizhzhia, under head coach Viktor Michienko.

Khvoshch qualified for the Ukrainian squad in the men's 60 kg class at the 2004 Summer Olympics in Athens. Earlier in the process, he placed ninth in the lightweight category from the 2003 World Wrestling Championships in Créteil, France to guarantee his spot on the Ukrainian wrestling team. Khvoshch lost two straight matches each to reigning world champion Armen Nazaryan of Bulgaria (1–8) and Egypt's Ashraf El-Gharably (3–12), leaving him on the bottom of the prelim pool and placing seventeenth in the final standings.

References

External links
 

1981 births
Living people
Ukrainian male sport wrestlers
Olympic wrestlers of Ukraine
Wrestlers at the 2004 Summer Olympics
People from Stakhanov, Ukraine
European Wrestling Championships medalists
Sportspeople from Luhansk Oblast
20th-century Ukrainian people
21st-century Ukrainian people